The MTV Movie Awards Mexico 2003 was hosted by José María Yazpik and Patricia Llaca.

Winners and nominees

Favorite Movie
Amar te duele
Ciudades Oscuras
De Qué Lado Estás
El crimen del Padre Amaro
La habitación azul

Favorite Actress
Ana Claudia Talancón as Amelia - El crimen del Padre Amaro
Fabiola Campomanes as Adela - De Qué Lado Estás
Irán Castillo as Gloria - El Tigre De Santa Julia
Martha Higareda as Renata - Amar te duele

Favorite Actor
Gael García Bernal as El Padre Amaro - El crimen del Padre Amaro
Kuno Becker as Adrián - La hija del caníbal
Luis Fernando Peña as Ulises - Amar te duele
Miguel Rodarte as El Tigre - El Tigre De Santa Julia

Best Song from a Movie
"Amarte Duele" — Natalia Lafourcade (Amar te duele)
"Caníbal" — Kinky (La hija del caníbal)
"Hiéreme" — La Verbena Popular (El Tigre De Santa Julia)
"La Velocidad Exacta" — Los Nena (De Qué Lado Estás)

Hottest Scene
Martha Higareda, alone in the bathroom - Amar te duele
Ana Claudia Talancón and Gael García Bernal, together in the hut - El crimen del Padre Amaro
Patricia Llaca and Juan Manuel Bernal, together in the road - La habitación azul
Miguel Rodarte with everyone - El Tigre De Santa Julia

Favorite Villain
Adalberto Parra as Calleja - El Tigre De Santa Julia
Alejandro Camacho as Romo - Zurdo
Alfonso Herrera as Francisco - Amar te duele
Jesús Ochoa as Riquelme - Ciudades Oscuras
Luisa Huertas as Dionisia - El crimen del Padre Amaro

Best Bichir in a Movie
Bruno Bichir as Satanás - Ciudades Oscuras
Demián Bichir as Manny - Bendito infierno
Odiseo Bichir as Javo - Ciudades Oscuras 
Demián Bichir as Mario - Ciudades Oscuras 
Bruno Bichir as Eduardo - Bendito infierno

MTV Movie & TV Awards